The 1804 United States presidential election in Connecticut took place between November 2 and December 5, 1804, as part of the 1804 United States presidential election. The state legislature chose nine representatives, or electors to the Electoral College, who voted for President and Vice President.

During this election, Connecticut cast nine electoral votes for Federalist Party candidate Charles Cotesworth Pinckney (becoming the only state other than Delaware to do so). However, he would lose to Democratic Republican incumbent Thomas Jefferson by a landslide margin nationally.

See also
 United States presidential elections in Connecticut

References

Connecticut
1804
1804 Connecticut elections